Stravino Jacobs (born ) is a South African rugby union player for the  in Super Rugby and the  in the Currie Cup. His regular position is centre or wing.

Jabobs was named in the  squad for the Super Rugby Unlocked competition.

Honours
 Currie Cup winner 2020–21, 2021
 Pro14 Rainbow Cup runner-up 2021

References

South African rugby union players
2000 births
Living people
Rugby union centres
Rugby union wings
Blue Bulls players
Bulls (rugby union) players